Hjelt is a surname. Notable people with the surname include:

August Hjelt (1862–1919), Finnish politician
Edvard Hjelt  (1855–1921), Finnish chemist and politician
Henrik Hjelt (born 1968), Swedish comedian and actor
Pekka Hjelt (born 1949), Finnish wrestler
Vera Hjelt (1857—1947), Finnish politician